John Henry Jolliffe (28 September 1865 – 5 July 1936) was an English first-class cricketer.

Jolliffe represented Hampshire in one first-class match in 1902 against Derbyshire at the County Ground, Southampton.

Jolliffe died at Whippingham on the Isle of Wight on 5 July 1936.

External links
Henry Jolliffe at Cricinfo
Henry Jolliffe at CricketArchive

1865 births
1936 deaths
People from Ventnor
Sportspeople from the Isle of Wight
English cricketers
Hampshire cricketers